"All You Get from Love Is a Love Song" is a song composed by Steve Eaton. Previously recorded by The Righteous Brothers in 1975, it was popularized by the Carpenters in 1977. It was released to the public on May 21, 1977. Its B-side was "I Have You", a song released on the A Kind of Hush album in 1976. The song was also included on their 1977 album, Passage.

In the late 1970s, this particular track appeared in a Top 10 of misheard lyrics (and is often on similar forums online). This was compiled by Noel Edmonds and the misheard lyric sounds like: "Because the best love songs are written with a broken arm," as opposed to the correct lyrics "Because the best love songs are written with a broken heart."

Charts

Weekly charts

Year-end charts

Personnel
Karen Carpenter – lead and backing vocals
Richard Carpenter – Fender Rhodes electric piano, piano, orchestration
Joe Osborn – bass guitar
Ed Greene – drums
Tony Peluso – guitar
Ray Parker Jr. – guitar
Tommy Vig - congas
Jerry Steinholtz - percussion
Tom Scott – tenor saxophone, baritone sax, flute
Julia Tillman – backing vocals
Carlene Williams – backing vocals
Maxine Willard – backing vocals

Music video
The music video to "All You Get from Love Is a Love Song" takes place in the A&M Studios. It starts off with the bongo drum and fades into a camera angle zooming towards Karen Carpenter. At the end of the video, the performance fades into a picture of the Carpenters' Hollywood Walk of Fame Star, which is the beginning to the video "Top of the World", performed on The Carpenters' Very First TV Special in 1976. It can be found on the DVD Gold: Greatest Hits. The tenor saxophone solo was performed by Tom Scott (also the tenor sax soloist on "Jazzman" by Carole King), who was then one of the hottest "session players" of the '70s.

References

External links
 

The Carpenters songs
1977 singles
1977 songs
A&M Records singles